In enzymology, a 2-oxoglutarate synthase is an enzyme that catalyzes the chemical reaction

2-oxoglutarate + CoA + 2 oxidized ferredoxin  succinyl-CoA + CO2 + 2 reduced ferredoxin

The 3 substrates of this enzyme are 2-oxoglutarate, CoA, and oxidized ferredoxin, whereas its 3 products are succinyl-CoA, CO2, and reduced ferredoxin.

This enzyme belongs to the family of oxidoreductases, specifically those acting on the aldehyde or oxo group of donor with an iron-sulfur protein as acceptor.  The systematic name of this enzyme class is 2-oxoglutarate:ferredoxin oxidoreductase (decarboxylating). Other names in common use include 2-ketoglutarate ferredoxin oxidoreductase, 2-oxoglutarate:ferredoxin oxidoreductase, KGOR, 2-oxoglutarate ferredoxin oxidoreductase, and 2-oxoglutarate:ferredoxin 2-oxidoreductase (CoA-succinylating).  This enzyme participates in the Citric acid cycle.  Some forms catalyze the reverse reaction within the Reverse Krebs cycle, as a means of carbon fixation.

References

 
 
 
 
 

EC 1.2.7
Enzymes of unknown structure